Novokuli (Ġaçalq̇a) is a rural locality (a selo) and the administrative center of Novokulinsky Selsoviet, Novolaksky District, Republic of Dagestan, Russia. The population was 2,386 as of 2010. There are 11 streets.

Geography 
Novokuli is located 15 km southwest of Khasavyurt, on the bank of the Yaryk-su River. Charavali and Zoriotar are the nearest rural localities.

Nationalities 
Chechens and Laks live there.

References 

Rural localities in Novolaksky District